Miss Earth Puerto Rico 2023 is the 19th edition of Miss Earth Puerto Rico that was held on January 29, 2023. Paulina Avilés-Feshold of Carolina crowned Victoria Arocho of Caguas as her successor at the end of the event. She will represent Puerto Rico at Miss Earth 2023 in Vietnam.

Results

Contestants 
28 contestants will compete for the title:

Notes

References